Michael Rene Taylor (born January 21, 1986) is an American former professional basketball player. He played college basketball for Chipola College and Iowa State.

College basketball
Collegiately, Taylor played three seasons for Chipola College (NJCAA-FCCAA, 2004–2005 to 2005–2006) and Iowa State University (2006–07), leading the latter team in scoring with 16.0 points per game. However, he was dismissed from the team in July 2007 after a series of brushes with the law.

Professional career

NBA
During 2007–08, he played for the Idaho Stampede of the NBA Development League, averaging 14.5 points per game in 39 games. Taylor was drafted 55th overall in the 2008 NBA draft by the Portland Trail Blazers, becoming the first player in NBA history to be drafted out of the D-League. Portland acquired the 55th pick, used to select Taylor, from the Phoenix Suns trade via the Indiana Pacers. However, he was traded to the Los Angeles Clippers on draft night in exchange for a future second-round draft pick, and signed with the team on July 15. On March 25, 2009, he scored an NBA career high 35 points at Madison Square Garden versus the New York Knicks. The Los Angeles Clippers waived Taylor on July 31, 2009.

Europe
Taylor signed a contract until the end of the 2009–2010 season with Serbian Crvena zvezda on November 20, 2009. He was brought to serve as a replacement for Maurice Bailey, who was released. Following the injury in the last team's Eurocup game of the season, on March 13, 2012, Taylor and Red Star Belgrade reached an agreement to part ways, mainly due to the financial problems the club was facing.

After playing with the Iowa Energy, he signed with the Italian team Tezenis Verona. He averaged 7,3 points and 4 rebounds over 4 games in the Italian League. In September 2011, he signed a one-year contract with Kavala. He averaged 13.9 points, 3.8 rebounds and 2 assists over 22 games in the Greek championship for them.

On July 9, 2012, Taylor signed with Nymburk for one season. Nymburk's head coach was very excited with the new arrival and he said: "Mike is a young, talented player.. an excellent point guard, but can also play shooting guard.. a great defender and a very good athlete." He left Nymburk in January 2013.

Return to America
On January 30, 2013, Taylor was acquired by the Los Angeles D-Fenders.

BAL
In October 2019, Taylor played with Al-Nasr Benghazi from Libya in the 2020 BAL Qualifying Tournaments. In February 2020, Taylor signed with Zamalek of Egypt to play in the BAL and the remainder of the 2019–20 Super League.

NBA career statistics

Regular season

|-
| align="left" | 
| align="left" | L.A. Clippers
| 51 || 5 || 15.1 || .412 || .325 || .691 || 1.7 || 2.1 || .7 || .0 || 5.7
|-
| align="left" | Career
| align="left" | 
| 51 || 5 || 15.1 || .412 || .325 || .691 || 1.7 || 2.1 || .7 || .0 || 5.7

References

External links

 NBA D-League Profile
 Eurocupbasketball.com Profile
 Eurobasket.com Profile
 FIBA.com Profile

1986 births
Living people
ABA League players
African-American basketball players
Al-Gharafa SC basketball players
American expatriate basketball people in China
American expatriate basketball people in the Czech Republic
American expatriate basketball people in Greece
American expatriate basketball people in Italy
American expatriate basketball people in Lebanon
American expatriate basketball people in Poland
American expatriate basketball people in Qatar
American expatriate basketball people in Serbia
American expatriate basketball people in South Korea
American expatriate basketball people in Turkey
American men's basketball players
Anyang KGC players
Basketball Nymburk players
Basketball players from Chicago
Big3 players
Chipola Indians men's basketball players
Greek Basket League players
Idaho Stampede players
Iowa Energy players
Iowa State Cyclones men's basketball players
Kavala B.C. players
KK Crvena zvezda players
Los Angeles Clippers players
Los Angeles D-Fenders players
Players drafted from the NBA Development League
Point guards
Portland Trail Blazers draft picks
Rosa Radom players
Scaligera Basket Verona players
Basketball players from Milwaukee
Turów Zgorzelec players
Yeşilgiresun Belediye players
21st-century African-American sportspeople
20th-century African-American people
American men's 3x3 basketball players